Bird of Prey is a British techno-thriller television serial written by Ron Hutchinson and produced by Michael Wearing and Bernard Krichefski for the BBC in 1982.  It was directed by Michael Rolfe.  The second series was co-written with Lee Montague.

The series starred Richard Griffiths and Carole Nimmons as Henry and Anne Jay: Henry is a humble civil servant who finds that he and his wife are drawn into a conspiracy involving the mysterious Le Pouvoir organisation. A sequel, Bird of Prey 2 followed in 1984.

Plot outline

Series 1
Henry Jay, a lacklustre and predictable government clerk compiling statistics and writing reports on computer fraud, suddenly finds himself with the threads of an international computer fraud in his hands. Forced to flee his wife and home when bodies start littering his path, he unexpectedly evades pursuit long enough to realise that his one chance at survival is to complete the puzzle and turn the tables on his pursuers – thus turning this very unlikely candidate into a "bird of prey".

Series 2
Again under attack, Henry Jay must escape the clutches of a professional assassin and the country they are in, find a way to eliminate the danger, and permanently safeguard his wife and himself.

Cast

Series 1
 Richard Griffiths as Henry Jay
 Carole Nimmons as Anne Jay
 Nigel Davenport as Charles Bridgnorth
 Christopher Logue as Hugo Jardine
 Jeremy Child as Tony Hendersly
 Roger Sloman as Harry Tomkins
 Trevor Martin as Chambers
 Pamela Moiseiwitsch as Miss Lucas
 Richard Ireson as Detective Sergeant Vine
 Jim Broadbent as Detective Inspector Richardson
 Michael O'Hagan as Detective Constable Slater
 Billy Hamon as Detective Constable Morrisey
 Stephen Thorne as Bank Manager
 Edmund Pegge as Lanchbury
 Sally Faulkner as Hannah Brent
 Mandy Rice-Davies as Julia
 Nicolas Chagrin as Louis Vacheron
 Rudi Delhem as Hotel Porter
 Wolfe Morris as Mr. Martin
 Henry Stamper as Dalgleish
 Guido Adorni as Mario
 Eddie Mineo as Dino

Series 2 
 Richard Griffiths as Henry Jay
 Carole Nimmons as Anne Jay
 Michael Cashman as Reeves
 Roland Curram as Mr. Adrian
 Jan Holden as Mrs. Lucas
 Hugh Fraser as Kelner
 Lee Montague as Roche
 Valerie Minifie as Irene Benson
 Jack Chissick as Fred Benson
 Richard Miles as Art Gallery Assistant
 Elaine Ford as Thelma Dent
 Terence Rigby as Duggan
 Heather Tobias as Halston
 Bob Peck as Greggory
 Joan Blackham as Kaye Greggory
 Timothy Bateson as Mr. Jorry
 Bara Chambers as Jenks
 Patrick Jordan as Mr Miles
 Stephen Churchett as Mr. Conry
 Marian Kemmer as Matron
 Stephane Vasseur as Spook
 Enrique Massari as Trapdoor

Filming locations
Bird of Prey (first season) makes heavy use of outdoor locations around the Docklands and the City of London, while Bird of Prey 2 includes the newly built Blackfriars in London and Silbury Boulevard in Milton Keynes.

DVD release
Bird of Prey and Bird of Prey 2 were released together on DVD x 2, BBC 2 Entertain, CCTV30316 (Region 2 + 4 colour PAL, UK) in 2006.

External links
 
 
 
 Episode Guide, Action TV
 DVD review, zetaminor.com
 Tony Smith, Bird of Prey: 1980s IT on the small screen, The Register, 7 November 2012

1982 British television series debuts
1984 British television series endings
BBC television dramas
1980s British drama television series
English-language television shows